Scores may refer to:

Scores New York, a strip club in New York
 Scores (album), a 2004 album by Barry Manilow
Scores, an album by Welsh band Hybrid
Scores (computer virus), a computer virus affecting Macintosh computers
Scores (restaurant), a restaurant chain in Canada
Scores on the doors, a term for published and displayed food hygiene results
The Scores, a neighbourhood in St Andrews, Scotland

See also
SCORE (disambiguation)
Score (disambiguation)
The Score (disambiguation)